The Good, the Bad and the Ugly: Original Motion Picture Soundtrack was released in 1966 alongside the Western film The Good, the Bad and the Ugly, directed by Sergio Leone. The score is composed by frequent Leone collaborator Ennio Morricone, whose distinctive original compositions, containing gunfire, whistling, and yodeling permeate the film. The main theme, resembling the howling of a coyote, is a two-note melody that is a frequent motif, and is used for the three main characters, with a different instrument used for each one: flute for Blondie (Man with No Name), arghilofono (ocarina) for Angel Eyes, and human voices for Tuco.

Among other elements, the score complements the film's American Civil War scenes, containing the mournful ballad "The Story of a Soldier", which is sung by prisoners as Tuco is being tortured by Angel Eyes. The film's famous climax, a three-way Mexican standoff, begins with the melody of "The Ecstasy of Gold" and is followed by "The Trio".

The main theme was a hit in 1968. The soundtrack album was on the charts for more than a year, reaching No. 4 on the Billboard pop album chart and No. 10 on the black album chart. The main theme was also a hit for American musician Hugo Montenegro, whose rendition on the Moog synthesizer was a No. 2 Billboard pop single in 1968. In 2008, the score was featured in the Grammy Museum at L.A. Live.

The album was remastered and re-released on Capitol Records on May 18, 2004, which had ten additional musical cues from the film. A European release by GDM music in 2001 contains even more music, with a running time of 59:30. In 2020, a three-disc release presenting the complete score and the original album was issued by the Spanish label Quartet Records.

Track listings 
All works composed by Ennio Morricone.

Original release date: December 29, 1966Audio CD release date: October 25, 1990

(*) tracks previously unreleased on the original album issued in 1966.(**) this track is extended and features music previously only heard in the film version of this piece, namely the original ending. The last part of this song is in mono.

Personnel 
Ennio Morricone – composer
Bruno Nicolai – conductor
 Unione Musicisti di Roma – orchestra
 I Cantori Moderni di Alessandroni – chorus
Edda Dell'Orso, Franco Cosacchi, Nino Dei, Enzo Gioieni, Gianna Spagnulo – vocals
Alessandro Alessandroni – whistling
 Italo Cammarota – arghilofono
Nicola Samale – flute
 E. Wolf Ferrari – english horn
 Michele Lacerenza, Francesco Catania – trumpet
Pino Rucher – electric guitar
 Bruno Battisti D'Amario – classical guitar
 Franco De Gemini – harmonica 
 Pierino Munari – percussion

References

External links 

Ennio Morricone soundtracks
1966 soundtrack albums
EMI Records soundtracks
Capitol Records soundtracks
Dollars Trilogy
Western film soundtracks